The Fletcher Henderson House, also known as Henderson-Burroughs House, in Cuthbert, Georgia, was built in 1888.  It was listed on the National Register of Historic Places in 1982.

The house was deemed significant as the home for 64 years of the leading black educator in Cuthbert, professor Fletcher Hamilton Henderson (1857-1943).  It is also notable as the boyhood home of jazz great Fletcher H. Henderson Jr., who was born December 18, 1897, and his brother Horace W. Henderson, who was born November 23, 1903.

References

Houses on the National Register of Historic Places in Georgia (U.S. state)
National Register of Historic Places in Randolph County, Georgia
Houses completed in 1888